With a Heart in My Song is the second collaborative studio album by guitarist Allan Holdsworth and pianist Gordon Beck, released in 1988 through JMS–Cream Records. Holdsworth and Beck had previously collaborated on The Things You See, released in 1980.

Track listing

Personnel
Allan Holdsworth – guitar, SynthAxe, engineering, mixing, production
Gordon Beck – keyboard

References

Allan Holdsworth albums
Gordon Beck albums
1988 albums
Collaborative albums